Auloplacidae is a family of sponges belonging to the order Sceptrulophora.

Genera:
 Auloplax Schulze, 1904
 Dictyoplax Reiswig & Dohrmann, 2014

References

Sponges